The Princess Switch is a 2018 American Christmas romantic comedy film directed by Mike Rohl from a screenplay by Robin Bernheim and Megan Metzger. The film stars Vanessa Hudgens, Sam Palladio, and Nick Sagar.

The film's concept of two people who look identical running into one another and switching places comes from Mark Twain's 1881 novel The Prince and the Pauper.

It was released on November 16, 2018, by Netflix. The film is the first installment in The Princess Switch trilogy.  It was followed by a sequel, The Princess Switch: Switched Again, which premiered on November 19, 2020, and The Princess Switch 3: Romancing the Star, which premiered on November 18, 2021.

Plot
A week before Christmas, Stacy’s assistant Kevin tells her that he has secretly entered her in a prestigious baking competition in the Kingdom of Belgravia. Initially reluctant, she agrees to go to Belgravia with Kevin and his daughter Olivia after an encounter with her ex-boyfriend.

At the competition, she runs into her rival Brianna, who ruins her clothes. In a dressing room, Stacy runs into Lady Margaret Delacourt, Duchess of Montenaro and fiancée of Crown Prince Edward of Belgravia, and they are struck by their identical looks. Desperate for time out of the spotlight, Margaret suggests that they switch places for two days, then switch back before the competition and Margaret and Edward's wedding. Initially reluctant, Stacy eventually accepts, especially when Lady Margaret agrees to sponsor Olivia as a student in Belgravia's acclaimed summer ballet program.

Stacy and Margaret quickly teach each other about their lives and behavior to minimize suspicion, and part ways. Olivia quickly discovers the switch but helps keep the secret while bonding with Margaret. Meanwhile, Prince Edward – who was supposed to be away on business for the two days of the switch – changes his plans to spend time with his fiancée. King George senses something is afoot, tasking his butler, Frank, to watch her. Stacy adapts to court life and begins falling in love with Prince Edward, while Margaret falls in love with Kevin and realizes that she loves living a normal life. Despite this, they switch back as planned. Meanwhile, Brianna sneaks into the TV station one night and sabotages Stacy's mixer.

Frank photographs Margaret and Stacy together, and shows that they swapped identities to the Queen. The Queen then fakes illness to send Edward and Margaret to attend the competition in her place. At the competition, due to Brianna's vandalism, Stacy is forced to mix her ingredients by hand. Despite the setback, Stacy and Kevin win first prize, with medals presented by Lady Margaret and Prince Edward, where their switch is discovered. Margaret professes her love for Kevin, while Stacy walks away, feeling out of place in Edward's royal life. Edward stops her and proposes, suggesting a Christmas wedding in a year if they are still in love.

One year later, Stacy marries Prince Edward and becomes Princess of Belgravia, and Margaret catches the bouquet.

Cast

 Vanessa Hudgens as 
 Stacy De Novo, a baker from Chicago
 Lady Margaret Delacourt, Duchess of Montenaro
 Sam Palladio as Edward Wyndham, Prince of Belgravia
 Nick Sagar as Kevin Richards, Stacy's best friend and Olivia's father
 Alexa Adeosun as Olivia Richards, Kevin's daughter and Stacy’s goddaughter
 Mark Fleischmann as Frank De Luca, Prince Edward's driver
 Suanne Braun as Mrs. Donatelli, Duchess Margret's personal assistant
 Sara Stewart as Queen Caroline Wyndham, Prince Edward's mother and Queen of Belgravia
 Pavel Douglas as King George Wyndham, Prince Edward's father and King of Belgravia
 Amy Griffiths as Brianna Michaels, Stacy's baking rival
 Robin Soans as Kindly Old Man

Production
In June 2018, it was reported that Vanessa Hudgens and Sam Palladio would star in the Netflix film The Princess Switch.

Principal photography ended in June 2018. The majority of the film was shot in Carei, Romania. The palace sequence was shot in Károlyi Castle, Carei Romania.

Release
It was released on November 16, 2018, by Netflix.

Reception
The website's critics consensus reads: "The Princess Switch offers a healthy dose of charming, light-hearted, twin-swap fun and is delightful viewing for any hopeless romantic."

Linda Holmes of NPR praised the movie's acting and called it a "pleasingly frothy and ridiculous", while criticizing unrealistic aspects of the plot.

Sequels
A sequel The Princess Switch: Switched Again, was released on November 19, 2020. Vanessa Hudgens took on another role as a third lookalike as well as served as a producer.

The next of its sequel The Princess Switch 3: Romancing the Star, was released on November 18, 2021. Vanessa Hudgens played three lookalikes as well as served as a producer.

See also
 List of Christmas films

References

External links
 
 
 
 

2018 films
2010s Christmas comedy films
2018 romantic comedy films
American Christmas comedy films
American romantic comedy films
2010s English-language films
Films about royalty
Films based on The Prince and the Pauper
Films shot in Romania
Films about interracial romance
English-language Netflix original films
2010s American films